Skinnskatteberg is a locality and the seat of Skinnskatteberg Municipality in Västmanland County, Sweden with 2,287 inhabitants in 2010.

Notable people
Johan Jakob Borelius (1823 – 1909), professor of theoretical philosophy

Gallery

References

External links
Skinnskatteberg Municipality - Official site

Municipal seats of Västmanland County
Swedish municipal seats
Populated places in Västmanland County
Populated places in Skinnskatteberg Municipality